Jamie Faye Fenton (born Jay Fenton) is a game programmer best known for the 1981 arcade game Gorf  and for being one of the creators of MacroMind's VideoWorks software (since renamed Macromedia Director). Jamie has been active in the transgender community and transitioned from male to female around 1998.

Biography
Fenton was drawn to computer technology while in school because its highly predictable nature appealed to her and it provided a haven from being picked on by other students.

In 1975,while studying computer science in the University of Wisconsin, Jamie and fellow student Tom McHugh volunteered to work at Dave Nutting Associates, who enlisted their help to redesign pinball machines and the Japanese arcade game Western Gun using Intel's 8080 microprocessor,  she also later worked on the Bally Astrocade. 

In 1978, Jamie created an early example of glitch art entitled Digital TV Dinner.

In 2018 Digital TV Dinner was exhibited in Chicago New Media 1973-1992 exhibition, curated by jonCates.

Works
Datsun 280 ZZZAP (1976)
Checkmate (1977)
Digital TV Dinner (1978)
Bally Astrocade BASIC re-write (1980)
Gorf (1981)
Robby Roto (1981)

See also

 Dona Bailey
 Danielle Bunten Berry
 Lucy Gilbert
 Patricia Goodson
 Rebecca Heineman
 Amy Hennig
 Brenda Laurel
 Suki Lee
 Chris Maddox
 Cathryn Mataga
 Carla Meninsky
 Laura Nikolich
 Carol Shaw
 Carol Ryan Thomas
 Joyce Weisbecker
 Anne Westfall

List of programmers
List of women in the video game industry
Women and video games
Women in computing

References

External links
Fentonia.com

Computer programmers
Transgender women
Living people
Year of birth missing (living people)